Tao Poon station is a MRT station in Bangkok, located on Tao Pun Junction, Bang Sue District, Bangkok. It is an interchange station of the Blue Line and Purple Line. It is also currently a terminal station for Purple line.

History 
The station was opened on 6 August 2016, initially with only Purple line service and were not connected to the rest of Bangkok's rapid transit the system due to construction delays and a contract dispute. This resulted in Prime Minister Prayut Chan-o-cha invoking the section 44 of the 2014 interim constitution of Thailand on 27 December 2016 to allow construction to proceed, and allowing BEM to operate Blue line service on this station. During that time, free shuttle bus service was provided, connecting Tao Poon station to a nearby Bang Sue MRT station.

The one-station Blue Line extension from Bang Sue to Tao Poon was opened on 11 August 2017, adding Blue Line service to the station and enabling direct transfers between the two lines. The station served as the terminal station of Blue line until 4 December 2019, when the Blue line service was extended from Tao Poon to Sirindhorn station.

Future 
The purple line was planned to be extended southward, from Tao Poon to Rat Burana. The extension has been approved by the cabinet in 2017, but bidding did not began until November 2021, which is set to be completed by March 2022. Construction is set to begin in third quarter of 2022 and expected to be complete by the end of 2027.

Gallery

References

External links

MRT (Bangkok) stations
Railway stations opened in 2016
2016 establishments in Thailand